Vornay is a commune in the Cher department in the Centre-Val de Loire region of France.

Geography
The village lies in the northern part of the commune, on the right bank of the Airain, which flows northwest through the commune, where it is joined by the river Craon.

Population

Sights
 The church of St. Germain, dating from the twelfth century.
 Some Roman ruins (a villa and an aqueduct).
 The chateau, dating from the twelfth century.

See also
Communes of the Cher department

References

External links

Official website of Vornay 

Communes of Cher (department)